Dandé is a department or commune of Houet Province in Burkina Faso.

Cities 
The department consists of a chief town :

 Dandé

and 4 villages:

References 

Departments of Burkina Faso
Houet Province